The Stolpersteine in Říčany lists the Stolpersteine in the town of Říčany. Stolpersteine is the German name for stumbling blocks collocated all over Europe by German artist, Gunter Demnig. The blocks commemorate the Nazi victims that were murdered, deported, exiled, or driven to suicide.

Generally, the stumbling blocks are posed in front of the building where the victims had their last self-chosen residence. The name of the Stolpersteine in Czech is Kameny zmizelých, that is, stones of the disappeared.

Stolpersteine

In 1930, 38 Jewish people lived in the city.

After the occupation of Czechoslovakia by German troops in 1939, Jewish shops in Říčany were "aryanized". Starting in 1942, deportations were carried out. Around 50 people were deported. A plaque in Říčany commemorates 42 of them. The focus of the arrest wave was on nine houses on Masaryk Square and Lázeňská Street. From there, Nazi troops deported 22 women, men and children, including the whole family Fišer, with the 91-year-old Anna Mahlerová. Only three deportees from Říčany could survive the Shoah.

The lists are sortable; the basic order follows the alphabet according to the last name of the victim.

Dates of collocations 

The Stolpersteine in Říčany were collocated by the artist himself on 19 September 2017.

See also 
 List of cities by country that have stolpersteine

External links

 stolpersteine.eu, Demnig's website
 holocaust.cz

References

Říčany
Monuments and memorials